Wanderers is the seventh studio album by Austrian symphonic metal band Visions of Atlantis, released by Napalm Records on 30 August 2019.

Reception 
The album received mostly positive reviews.
Tuonela Magazine described the album “Not all those who wander are lost” – the infamous quote by author J.R.R Tolkien, describes the general idea of the album’s concept. VISIONS OF ATLANTIS’ seventh album offers a fascinating musical and lyrical journey across the untamed seas along a powerful path towards self-discovery".	Tuonela Magazine also stated, "Visions of Atlantis have managed to create beautiful melodies, carried by the amazing duets between Clémentine Delauney and Michele Guaitoli. “Wanderers” offers the listener an atmospheric journey, with its grand orchestrations, and magical soundscapes. The band has managed to create an album which contains very diverse tracks, that works well as a whole."

Track listing

Personnel 
	

	

	
Band members
	
Clémentine Delauney – lead vocals, backing vocals
	
Michele Guaitoli – lead vocals, backing vocals
	
Christian Douscha – guitars
	
Herbert Glos – bass guitars
	
Thomas Caser – drums

Guests/Session Musicians

Frank Pitters / Keyboards (Tracks 1, 2, 4, 6-9, 11-13)
Hannes Braun / Keyboards (Track 3)

Charts

References

External Links
	
| Wanderers by Visions of Atlantis at Discogs
	
	

	
	

	
	

Visions of Atlantis albums
2019 albums